WMTN-LP (103.1 FM, "The Mountain") is a radio station broadcasting a variety music format. Licensed to Sewanee, Tennessee, United States, the station is currently owned by St. Andrew's-Sewanee School.

References

External links
 
 

MTN-LP
Franklin County, Tennessee